The Football Federation of the 5th Department Caaguazú (Federación de Fútbol Quinto Departamento Caaguazú) is the departamental governing body of football (soccer) in the department of Caaguazú, in Paraguay. The federation is responsible for the organization of football leagues in the different cities of the department and it is also the regulator of the clubs. The main office of this federation is located in the city of Coronel Oviedo.

Tournaments for each league of this federation are played every year to determine the best teams. Afterwards, the champions of each league face each other to determine the best team in the department, with the overall winner being promoted to a higher division in the Paraguayan football league system.

Leagues in Caaguazú

Liga Caaguazú de Fútbol
The Liga Caaguazú de Fútbol is based in the city of Caaguazú. The following teams are part of this league:
 Sportivo San Lorenzo
 Atletico Caaguazu
 Olimpia
 Cerro Porteno
 15 de Agosto
 8 de Diciembre
 General Bernardino Caballero
 Carlos Antonio Lopez
 Guarani
 Sportivo Villa Construccion
 19 de Marzo

Liga Deportiva de Carayao
The Liga Deportiva de Carayao is based in the city of Carayao. The following teams are part of this league:
 Nacional
 Sportivo Carayao
 6 de Enero 
 1 de Mayo
 29 de Junio
 3 de Febrero
 13 de Junio
 25 de Enero
 13 de Diciembre
 Jovenes Unidos
 3 de Febrero
 13 de Junio
 8 de Diciembre
 Sportivo Mainumby

Liga de Fútbol Dr. Cecilio Báez
The Liga de Fútbol Dr. Cecilio Báez is based in the city of Cecilio Báez. The following teams are part of this league:
 Independiente
 15 de Mayo
 10 de Mayo
 4 de Octubre
 1 de Mayo
 Simon Bolivar
 25 de Diciembre
 11 de Febrero

Liga Deportiva Campo 9
The Liga Deportiva Campo 9 is based in the city of Eulogio Estigarribia. The following teams are part of this league:
 Atletico Florestal
 Sportivo Campo 9
 Libertad
 Atletico Culantrillo
 Mariscal Lopez
 Atletico Valencia
 Santo Domingo de Guzman
 Sol del Este
 1 de Marzo
 Independiente
 Atletico Raul Arsenio Oviedo

Liga Santarroseña de Fútbol 
The Liga Santarroseña de Fútbol is based in the city of Santa Rosa del Mbutuy. The following teams are part of this league:
 30 de Agosto
 Guarani
 13 de Mayo
 Nueva Estrella
 6 de Enero
 24 de Junio FBC
 Nacional FBC
 8 de Diciembre
 4 de Agosto
 Nacional
 Deportivo San Jose Obrero
 S.D. San Agustin

Liga Deportiva La Pastora
The Liga Deportiva La Pastora is based in the city of La Pastora. The following teams are part of this league:
 13 de Junio FBC
 Sportivo Santo Domingo
 Libertad
 Union Agricola
 Atletico Central
 Raza Guarani
 25 de Diciembre

Liga Ovetense de Fútbol
The Liga Ovetense de Fútbol is based in the city of Coronel Oviedo. The following teams are part of this league:
 12 de Junio
 Galicia FBC
 Cerro Porteno
 Libertad
 15 de Mayo FBC
 Juventud Guarani
 Sportivo Aguapety
 General Diaz
 3 de Noviembre
 11 de Setiembre
 S.D. San Miguel
 1 de Mayo
 1 de Marzo
 Sportivo Blas Garay
 12 de Octubre
 Coronel Oviedo
 Universitario
 8 de Diciembre
 Juventud Ita Ybate
 S. y D. Guarani

Liga Deportiva de Pastoreo
The Liga Deportiva de Pastoreo is based in the city of Juan Manuel Frutos. The following teams are part of this league:
 Sportivo Pastoreo
 Nueva Estrella
 29 de Setiembre
 Sportivo Santa Rosa
 20 de Julio
 Sol de America

Liga Repatriación de Fútbol
The Liga Repatriación de Fútbol is based in the city of Repatriación. The following teams are part of this league:
 Atletico Repatriacion
 1 de Mayo
 24 de Mayo
 Vicente Ignacio Iturbe
 Atletico Unidos
 General Fco. Caballero Alvarez
 Sportivo Chacore
 Universo
 Universidad Catolica
 Juventud Unidos

Liga Deportiva San Joaquín
The Liga Deportiva San Joaquín is based in the city of San Joaquín. The following teams are part of this league:
 Teniente Robustiano Esquibel
 Guarani
 1 de Mayo
 Sportivo San Joaquin
 Atletico Peyupa
 1 de Enero

Liga Sanjosiana de Deportes
The Liga Caaguazú de Fútbol is based in the city of San José de los Arroyos. The following teams are part of this league:
 Sportivo San Jose
 20 de Julio
 Sportivo Paraguay
 Capellan Benicio Britos
 Atletico Independiente
 13 de Junio
 19 de Marzo
 Olimpia
 Deportivo San Blas
 J.D.K. Fútbol club

Liga Deportiva de Yhú
The Liga Deportiva de Yhú is based in the city of Yhú. The following teams are part of this league:
 Deportivo Yhu
 Atletico Cerro Cora
 29 de Setiembre
 Sportivo San Ramon
 Deportivo Agricola
 1 de Mayo
 24 de Mayo
 Independiente

Liga Deportiva 3 de Febrero
The following teams are part of this league:
 24 de Junio
 3 de Febrero
 19 de Marzo
 Deportivo San Carlos
 Boca Juniors
 20 de Junio
 Nacional
 Atletico Juventud Unido

Liga Deportiva Agro-Yguazú
The following teams are part of this league:
 Atletico Raul Arsenio Oviedo
 Atletico Universal
 8 de Diciembre
 Atletico Sol Naciente
 Atletico Central
 Atletico Sati
 Sport Yhaguy

Liga Vaquería de Fútbol
The following teams are part of this league:
 Atletico Vaqueria
 12 de Octubre
 24 de Junio
 Union Agricola
 Libertad
 Nueva Estrella
 Atletico Tekojoja
 1 de Marzo
 Nueva Toledo

External links
 UFI Website

Caaguazu
Caaguazú Department